Sudhendu Bhattacharya (1 April 1920 – 7 May 1999) was an Indian cricket umpire. He stood in two Test matches between 1964 and 1969.

See also
 List of Test cricket umpires

References

1920 births
1999 deaths
Cricketers from Kolkata
Indian Test cricket umpires